The Redeemer is a studio album by British musician Dean Blunt, released in 2013 on Hippos in Tanks.

Track listing
All tracks written and produced by Dean Blunt, except "The Redeemer" (co-produced by Arca).

Notes
 "I Run New York" contains a sample of "All My Life" by K-Ci & JoJo.
 "Demon" and "Imperial Gold" feature uncredited vocals from Joanne Robertson
 "Demon" and "Need 2 Let U Go" feature uncredited trumpet from David Gray
 "Demon" contains a sample of "Sat in Your Lap" by Kate Bush.
 "The Redeemer" features vocals from Inga Copeland and a sample of "Oh Daddy" by Fleetwood Mac.
 "Need 2 Let U Go" features uncredited vocals from Kieran Kennedy Young, S. Bronze, and Thomas Bush
 "Papi" contains a sample of "Echoes" by Pink Floyd.
 "All Dogs Go to Heaven" features uncredited guitar from Alexander Fnug Olsen
 "Brutal" features uncredited piano from Lin Sien Koong and contains a sample of "The Roof" by Mariah Carey.
 All tracks feature uncredited mastering from Amir Shoat

References

2013 albums
Concept albums
Albums produced by Arca (musician)
Art pop albums